USS Capella may refer to the following ships of the United States Navy: 

 , built in 1920 as the Comerant by American International Shipbuilding
 , a vehicle cargo ship launched on 1 September 1972

United States Navy ship names